Pavlos Mousouros was the Ottoman-appointed Prince of Samos from 1866 to 1873.

He was the brother of Konstantinos Mousouros and like him became a diplomat, serving as ambassador of the Ottoman Empire to the Austrian Empire. He was recalled in 1866 and appointed Prince of Samos. During his tenure there, he constructed the road connecting Vathy with Mytilinioi and some bridges. 

Disregarding the established rights and privileges of the Principality of Samos, he proposed the construction of a permanent camp for the Ottoman soldiers resident in the Principality. However the proposition was turned down by the Samian Parliament. He was generally viewed by the Samian population as an unjust ruler.

1810 births
1876 deaths
Princes of Samos
Pavlos
19th-century rulers in Europe
Constantinopolitan Greeks
Diplomats from Istanbul